The IAR-826 was an agricultural aircraft built in Romania in the 1970s. Based on the IAR-822, it was a conventional low-wing monoplane with fixed, tailwheel undercarriage and differed from its predecessor mainly being a design for an all-metal version of the 822.

Development
The IAR-826 is an agricultural crop sprayer and duster. It is the direct descendant of the IAR-822. The design was completed under the leadership of engineer Radu Manicatide in 1973, at IMFCA Bucharest (Institutul de Mecanica Fluidelor si Cercetari Aerospatiale — Institute of Fluid Mechanics and Aerospace Research).

Since the wooden structure technique was obsolete, the team led by Manicatide produced a design for an all-metal version of the 822. The IAR-826s were built at IAR Brasov in smaller numbers than the 822.

A low-wing monoplane, the fuselage skin was entirely made of aluminium and the controls and trimmer were electrically actuated. The all-metal structure, although much more stiffer, lowered even more the already weak thrust to weight ratio.

It was built at IRMA (Intreprinderea de Reparatii Material Aeronautic — Enterprise for Aeronautical Material Repairement), in Bucharest.

Operational history
Designated IAR-826, it first flew on 9 May 1973. Three weeks later the IAR-826 prototype, YR-MDA was displayed at Le Bourget.

IAR 826 were in use until the early 80's, with an average on 400 flight hours / year / airframe; being used mostly as agricultural planes, but sometimes also for the aerial surveillance of the pipe lines and power lines.

Variants
IAR-826 13 examples built by IAR Brasov in 1973-74, registered in the YR-MDA to YR-MDM range.

Operators
Romanian Utilitary Aviation — the only operator of the IAR-826

Specifications (IAR-826)

See also

References

 
 
 
 
 Уголок неба

External links
 IAR 822 pdf brochure

1960s Romanian agricultural aircraft
826
Aircraft first flown in 1973
Low-wing aircraft
Single-engined tractor aircraft